Soliga or Sholaga may refer to:
 The Soliga people of Karnataka and Tamil Nadu, India
 Sholaga language, the Dravidian language spoken by them